Gottlieb Bodmer (1804–1837) was a German painter, designer, and lithographer.

Life
Bodmer was born at Munich in 1804. He first painted portraits under Stieler. In 1829 he lithographed the Madonna di San Sisto, after the engraving of F. Müller, and later two paintings after H. Hess, viz., Christmas Eve, and a small altar-piece; by these works he is favourably known. He visited Paris, and returning to Munich, died in 1837.

Works
His works include:

The Departure of King Otto.
King Ludwig I. in his Family Circle.
The Knight and his Love; after Foltz.
The Swiss Grenadier; after Kirner.

See also
 List of German painters

References

Sources
 

19th-century German painters
19th-century German male artists
German male painters
German lithographers
Artists from Munich
1804 births
1837 deaths